This is a list of notable official residences of university and college presidents in the United States.  For the world-wide list, see List of university presidents' houses.

Alabama
 President's Mansion (University of Alabama)
President's House, Marion Institute, of Marion Military Institute, Marion, Alabama, NRHP-listed in Perry County
 President's House (Auburn, Alabama), Auburn University
Arizona
 President's House (Tempe, Arizona), Arizona State University
Arkansas
President's House (Conway, Arkansas)
 President's House (Southern Arkansas University), Magnolia, Arkansas

California
 Hoover House - President of Stanford University
 Blake House -  President of the University of California system
 Selden Williams House - President of the University of California system
 Chancellor's House, College Park - Chancellor of UC Davis
 Tierney University House - Chancellor of UC Irvine
 University House - Chancellor of UC Santa Barbara
 Geisel University House - Chancellor of UC San Diego
 University House - Chancellor of UC Berkeley
 Chancellor’s Residence - Chancellor of UCLA
 University House - Chancellor of UCSF

District of Columbia
 F Street House - George Washington University
 President's House - Gallaudet College

Florida
 President's House (University of Florida)

Georgia
 President's House (University of Georgia)

Indiana
 Bryan House (Bloomington, Indiana), Indiana University
 Allison Mansion, Marian University
 Westwood House (West Lafayette, Indiana), Purdue University

Iowa
President's Cottage, Oskaloosa, Iowa

Kentucky
President's Home (Bowling Green, Kentucky), NRHP-listed in Warren County

Louisiana
President's Home, Northwestern State University, NRHP-listed in Natchitoches Parish
Dodd College President's Home, NRHP-listed in Caddo Parish

Massachusetts
 Brandeis University President's House, Newton, Massachusetts
 President's House (Harvard)

Michigan
 President's House, University of Michigan

Minnesota
 Eastcliff, University of Minnesota, Saint Paul

New Hampshire
 President's House (Keene State College), New Hampshire

New Jersey
 President's House (Princeton University), New Jersey
 President's House (Rutgers), New Brunswick, New Jersey

New Mexico
President's House (University of New Mexico), Albuquerque, New Mexico, NRHP-listed in Bernalillo County
 Nason House, formerly the University President's House at New Mexico State University

Ohio
President's House (Heidelberg University), Tiffin, Ohio, NRHP-listed in Seneca County

Oklahoma
Boyd House (University of Oklahoma), Norman, Oklahoma, known as President's House and as OU White House

Oregon
McMorran House, Eugene, Oregon, one University of Oregon's buildings

Pennsylvania
 Chancellor's Residence (University of Pittsburgh)
President's House (Washington & Jefferson College), Washington, Pennsylvania

Rhode Island
 President's House (Naval War College), Newport, Rhode Island

South Carolina
 President's House (Clemson University), South Carolina
 Harbison College President's Home, Abbeville, South Carolina

Tennessee
 Samuel Rexinger House, Clarksville, Tennessee
 Shelbridge, Johnson City, Tennessee

Texas
President's House (Commerce, Texas), NRHP-listed in Hunt County
President's House at Texas College, Tyler, Texas, NRHP-listed in Smith County

Utah
Westminster College President's House, NRHP-listed in Salt Lake City

Virginia
 President's House (College of William & Mary), Williamsburg, Virginia
 Vawter Hall and Old President's House, Virginia State University
 Brompton (Fredericksburg, Virginia), University of Mary Washington
 Carr’s Hill, University of Virginia, Charlottesville, Virginia

West Virginia
 President's House (Bluefield State College), West Virginia
Young-Noyes House, University of Charleston

See also
List of university presidents' houses (world-wide list)
List of governors' residences in the United States